Gabriella Hámori (born 1 November 1978) is a Hungarian actress. She appeared in more than twenty films since 2000.

Selected filmography

References

External links 

1978 births
Living people
Hungarian film actresses